Exl or EXL may refer to:

People 
 Anna Exl (1882–1969), Austrian actor
 Ferdinand Exl (1875–1942), Austrian actor
 Ilse Exl (1907–1956), Austrian actor

Acronym 
 Experiential Learning
 Extended Learning

Other uses 
 EXL Service, an American operations management and analytics company
 Sunshine Express Airlines, an Australian airline